Sverepec is a village in the Považská Bystrica District, Trenčín Region of northwestern Slovakia

History
In historical records the village was first mentioned in 1321. From 1981 to 1990, it was part of Považská Bystrica.

Geography
The village lies at an altitude of 315 metres and covers an area of 6.233 km2. It has a population of 1102 people.

References

External links

 

Villages and municipalities in Považská Bystrica District